Sevan Football Club, formerly Junior Sevan Football Club, was a football club based in Sevan, Armenia. It was the only football club that represented the Gegharkunik Province of Armenia.

History
Sevan Football Club was founded in 2018 as Junior Sevan Football Club, in the town of Sevan. In its first year of foundation, Junior Sevan applied and took part in the Armenian First League. Even though it won the 2018–19 league season, the club was not granted a license for promotion to the Premier League for not having met the required standards. On 25th of June, 2019, the club announced that the name was changed to Sevan FC. After playing three seasons in the lower Armenian league, they were finally  able to get promoted to the premier league by winning the 2020-21 Armenian First League.

On 1 December 2021, the Football Federation of Armenia Disciplinary Committee voted in favor to remove Sevan from the Armenian Premier League after they failed to turn up for two games in a row, against Alashkert and BKMA Yerevan. As a result, all of Sevan's results were excluded from the championship table.

League and cup

Players

Current squad

Managerial history

  Syarhey Herasimets (1 August 2018 – 12 February 2019)
  Armen Ghulinyan (12 February 2019 – 26 April 2019)
  Armen Sanamyan (26 April 2019 – 31 July 2019)
  Vitali Culibaba (31 July 2019 – 30 August 2019)
  Armen Sanamyan (31 August 2019 – 6 September 2020)
  Armen Shahgeldyan (7 September 2020 – 1 December 2021)

References

Sevan FC
Sevan
2018 establishments in Armenia
Association football clubs established in 2018